Bernard Montrenaud (born 28 March 1944) is a French former professional tennis player.

Montrenaud was a finalist at the 1969 French national championships, losing to François Jauffret.

During his career he featured in the singles second round at Roland Garros on four occasions and was a mixed doubles quarter-finalist with Janine Lieffrig in 1971. He also appeared in several editions of the Wimbledon Championships.

References

External links
 
 

1944 births
Living people
French male tennis players